Wu Yue (born 25 April 1976) is a Chinese film and television series actor. Some of his more notable roles include Chen Zhen in Huo Yuanjia and Jingwu Yingxiong Chen Zhen (2001); Di Yun in Lian Cheng Jue (2004); Sun Wukong in Journey to the West (2011); Ariq Böke in The Legend of Kublai Khan (2013); and Wan Zonghua in Ip Man 4 (2019).

Wu enrolled in the Central Academy of Drama in 1997 and graduated in 2001. Apart from acting, he practises martial arts and holds a National Martial Arts Championship grade in wushu. He is currently a member of the National Theatre Company of China. He also wrote lyrics and performed songs for some of the films and television series he acted in.

Filmography

Film

Television

Variety show

Theater

Discography

Accolades
 National Martial Arts Championship, Seventh National Games (1993)
 Champion in bajiquan category, National Wushu Championship (1994)
 Silver Medal (representing Ningxia province), Fifth National Games for Ethnic Minorities (1995)
 First Place in bajiquan category, National Personal Elite Championship (1996)
 Fifth Place in nanquan category, Eighth National Games (1997)
 Five champion titles, Beijing College Wushu Competition (1998 / 1999)
 Audience's Favourite Actor in Action Genre in Ten Years of Film and Television, Ninth Digital Film Lily Awards (2009)

References

External links
 
Wu Yue at chinesemov.com
  Wu Yue on Sina.com

1976 births
Living people
Male actors from Hebei
Chinese male film actors
Chinese male television actors
People from Zhangjiakou
Central Academy of Drama alumni
Chinese wushu practitioners
Sportspeople from Hebei
Hui male actors
Singers from Hebei
Chinese male stage actors
20th-century Chinese male actors
21st-century Chinese male actors
21st-century Chinese male singers